Exoditis  is a genus of moths of the family Xyloryctidae from Madagascar.

Species
The species of this genus are:

Exoditis boisduvalella Viette, 1956
Exoditis dominiqueae Viette, 1955
Exoditis janineae Viette, 1955
Exoditis subfurcata Meyrick, 1933
Exoditis sylvestrella Viette, 1955
Exoditis vadonella Viette, 1955

References

 
Xyloryctidae genera
Xyloryctidae